Khumulwng is a town in the West Tripura district in the Indian state of Tripura. It is the headquarters and the largest town of the Tripura Tribal Areas Autonomous District Council.

History
Khumulwng was established in 1991. The TTAADC headquarters was shifted to the town from 1996 onwards.

Geography
It is situated 18 km from Agartala.

Kokchap Nok
The most beautiful landmark of the town is the Kaunsil Nok (Council House) located right in the heart of the town. This structure houses the legislative body of the TTAADC (Tripura Tribal Areas Autonomous District Council).

Demographics
The ethnic population of the town are the Tripuri people formed about 99% in the area, rest are others. The local language is Kokborok. They have a distinct identity of their own. They are mongoloid people and speaks Sino-Tibetan language like the rest of Northeast India's Indigenous native peoples.

Culture
Various socio-cultural clubs are coming up to develop the local culture, flora and fauna.
The cultural beauty and abundance in Khumulwng is invaluable. The town is a blend of Tipra culture and the Christian influence. We see people celebrating the Goria Ter as well as the Christmas with much joyfulness. Most of the people, by profession, here are either government employees and their families or business oriented.

Churches

There are many Churches in and around the town area, most notably

St.Thomas Believers Eastern Church:- Believers Eastern Church Tripura was established by Rev.Anil Kumar Debbarma, who is now known as Bishop Anil Mor Philemon, the first Ordained Bishop of BEC among the tripuri community, in the month of February 1996 (his wife Suchitra Debbarma was also present throughout the journey of BEC Tripura). It started as Gospel for Asia (GFA) Bible training center with only 30 students. Gospel for Asia Bible training center (now known BEC minor seminary) is the first Bible collage in Tripura. At present, the BEC church campus in Khumulwng stays as the headquarter for the four mission dioceses under Believers Eastern Church Tripura. This church and the seminary was established while Khumulwng was still a forest area with very less people living there. Being the first Bible college of Tripura, it was not easy for the pioneers to not face any troublesome days.

 Khumulwng Baptist Church:- This church was established on 22 March 1998. Rev.Chuanshekhor Debbarma, Dn. Bhupendra Debbarma, Dn. Hemchandra Debbarma and many Christians of Khumulwng area had faced many barriers to established the Church at Khumulwng. At that time the church had a thatch roofed prayer house. It has now a beautiful Church building which was designed by Er. Dhaniram Debbarma and Er. Ranjit Debbarma and built during his 10 years tenure(2001–2010) as Secretary of the Church. This church has 471 members(AS per census 2010).
 Zion Baptist Church
 Joygobin Baptist Church
 Khakchangma Baptist Church
 Dashram Baptist Church
 Galili Baptist Church
 Immanuel Baptist Church
 Rangchak Baptist Church
 Mwichwnghar Baptist Church
 Presbyterian Church
On every December a fair is organized by the group of local churches where people of all walks of life and from all faith participate to show their brotherhood.

Tourism

Khumulwng Museum and Heritage Centre 

Khumulwng Museum and Heritage Centre is a popular destination for tourist who visits the scenic town. It houses the indigenous Tiprasa culture and folk art. It also have collections of rare Tiprasa jewelleries, crafts, instruments and paintings.

The museum exhibits the Indigenous Tiprasa cultures related to dresses, cloths, real life sized sculptures and inscriptions. Annually, it gets a visitors above thousand.

Economy
Khumulwng act as the junction of transportation and business for the interior villages. It is fast emerging as the local business hub amongst the TTAADC.

Banks
The banks present in the town are:

 State Bank of India

 United Bank of India
 Tripura Gramin Bank

Markets
There are some markets in the town area catering to the growing needs of the town population. They are:
 Dukmali Hati, the main central market of the town
 Khumulwng Super Market
 Salka Hati Multicomplex

Education

Schools
There are three important schools in Khumulwng. They are:
 Yakhili Academy, a privately run school by Sadar North Baptist Association.
 Khumpui Academy, school run by TTAADC.
 Khumpui Academy Annexe, an adjacent branch of the Khumpui Academy established in 2021.
 Eklayva High School, a central government school.
 Sal Sampili (SASA) Academy, a private English Medium school.

Colleges 

 Government General Degree College, Khumulwng
 Government Polytechnic Institute, Khumulwng
 Industrial Training Institute, Khumulwng
 NIELIT, Khumulwng
 Tripura Tribal Folk Music College
 TTAADC Polytechnic Institute, Khumulwng
 Borok Paramedical Institution & Technology, Khumulwng

Government 
Khumulwng is the capital and the headquarter of the Tripura Tribal Areas Autonomous District Council Government. Presently, the council is led by the Tipra Motha Party since the 2021 election.

Transport
Khumulwng can be accessed through road with the Assam-Agartala National Highway 44. The nearest stop on the highway is in Jirania (3 km) and the newly developing junction of Madhob Kami (2 km).

Khumulwng Motor Stand
It is located in the center of the town and is a place for motor vehicles running to neighbouring towns of Agartala, Jirania and Jampuijala.

Railway station
The nearest railway station is Jirania Railway Station, 3 km away from the town across the river Haora.

Airport
The nearest airport is Agartala Airport located about 35 km away.

Civic amenities

Town hall
Khumulwng has a Town-Hall situated near the Kaunsil Nok which is used by the people of the town for organizing various programs and functions.

Park
Across the Town-Hall is a park, used often as a picnic spot which is surrounded on three sides by a man-made lake.

Hospital
There is a government run hospital named as Kherengbar Hospital to serve the needs of the town and the surrounding population.

Stadium
There is a stadium in the town constructed by the Government which hosts many events and parades.

Kokborok Library
The Kokborok Language Library is situated in Khumulwng near the stadium and is run by the TTAADC administration.

Recent events

Festival of Indigenous Tiprasa (FIT) 
The Festival of Indigenous Tiprasa or FIT is a musical festival organised by Sports and Youth  Affairs Department of the TTAADC Government in Khumulwng. It was first held in 2021 for three days long. Famous artists that performed in FIT are Borkung Hrangkhawl, Bollywood singer Papon and Lucky Ali.

TBYF
A huge gathering called Tripura Baptist Youth Fellowship was organized on 28–30 January 2005 in Khumulwng Baptist Church. The total delegation crossed 1500 strength. Delegates came from all over Tripura and even from Mizoram. Executives of TBCU, Zoram Baptist Mission and Evangelical Church of Maraland also took part in the fellowship. Different tribes of Tripura came and mingled with each other as if all were the same, like all in one, in Christ. The fellowship included Musical Meet, Discussions and Bible Classes.

See also
 Kokborok
 Tripuri people
 Sadar North Baptist Association

References

External links
 adc.twipra.com TTAADC website hosted by KOHM

 
Cities and towns in West Tripura district
West Tripura district